Vanishing Falls, is a waterfall located on the Salmon River at the south skirt of the Mount Hood National Forest, in Clackamas County, in the U.S. state of Oregon. It is located in a privileged area where the river creates several waterfalls: Final Falls, Frustration Falls, Little Niagara Falls, and Copper Creek Falls are within a mile from Vanishing Falls; while Hideaway Falls, Split Falls, and Stein Falls are approximately two miles away.

The cascade and its river trail are surrounded by forest of Douglas fir, western hemlock, and red cedar, interspersed with bigleaf maple, red alder and black cottonwood trees.

Access 
Hiking to Vanishing Falls starts at a trailhead that runs south along Salmon River starting in the town of Welches on U.S. Route 26 as it goes through Mount Hood National Forest. Vanishing Falls is the first waterfall upstream Salmon River trail, after Frustration Falls towards Final Falls.

See also 
 List of waterfalls in Oregon

References 

Waterfalls of Oregon
Parks in Clackamas County, Oregon
Waterfalls of Clackamas County, Oregon